Daryl Braithwaite... Best Of is a compilation album – and also the debut solo album – by Australian singer-songwriter, and Sherbet lead-singer, Daryl Braithwaite. It comprised solo singles released to date, including the Australian number-one hit "You're My World". Both A-sides and B-sides of all seven of his solo singles from 1974 through to 1978 are included. It peaked at No. 32 on the Kent Music Report Albums Chart.

Track listing

External links

References

Daryl Braithwaite albums
Compilation albums by Australian artists
1978 greatest hits albums